Rahona is a genus of moths in the subfamily Lymantriinae. It was named by Paul Griveaud in 1975.

Most of the species of this genus occur in central Africa or Madagascar.

The name was inadvertently used again in 1998 for a fossil species of Avian theropod Rahona ostromi, by Catherine Forster and colleagues. When they discovered that the name had already been used by Griveaud, they renamed the fossil Rahonavis.

Species
Some species of this genus are:

References

Lymantriinae
Moth genera
Moths of Africa
Moths of Madagascar